Lisitsite is a village in Kardzhali Municipality, Kardzhali Province, southern Bulgaria.

The village is located in Rhodope Mountains on the banks of the Arda river. The longest suspension bridge in Bulgaria crossing over Studen Kladenets Dam is the only way into the village. A Thracian fortress is located 100 meters south of the village, about 15 km southeast of Kardzhali. Nearby is the mythical area of Dambala.

References

Villages in Kardzhali Province